is a member of the Liberal Democratic Party serving in the Japanese House of Representatives. He served as the Minister of Agriculture, Forestry and Fisheries in Shinzo Abe's cabinet. 

He has been a member of the House of Representatives since 2009. Saito is a member of the Ishiba faction, led by Shigeru Ishiba, which is critical of the Abe administration. In his position, he has continued to keep the tariff hike on foreign beef.

References

Liberal Democratic Party (Japan) politicians
Ministers of Agriculture, Forestry and Fisheries of Japan
1959 births
Living people
Harvard University alumni